"Torn" is the first official single (second overall) from American R&B singer LeToya's debut album LeToya which was released in March 2006 and soon became a hit, having a high airplay, just missing out the top ten on the U.S. Hot 100 Airplay charts at number eleven. "Torn" became a hit on the U.S. Hot R&B/Hip-Hop Songs, peaking at number two. It also entered the top twenty on the Rhythmic Top 40 and Adult R&B charts.

In September 2006, the song was finally released in other countries all over the world, namely the United Kingdom, New Zealand, and Australia and became a moderate worldwide hit.

The song is about the protagonist being "torn" between staying with or leaving her lover (played in the music video by Will Demps). The song contains a musical sample of The Stylistics's 1971 classic "You Are Everything."

The official remix is known as the "So So Def Remix" featuring guest appearances from rappers Mike Jones and Rick Ross and production from Jermaine Dupri. The album version is also slightly different from the single version and there is also a version with rapper Short Dogg and Dave Young, co-writer of Torn, singing along with LeToya.

The UK CD single features the b-side "No More", written by Candice Nelson and Walter Millsap.

"Torn" had one of its biggest successes on BET's 106 & Park. It reached number one in eleven days and stayed there for twenty-five days straight. It remained on the countdown for sixty-five days.

Music video
The video was directed by Chris Robinson and debuted on BET Access Granted on July 5, 2006.

The music clip is featured as an enhanced video on the European edition and the Japanese Special edition of the album LeToya.

Sample

The song samples "Everything" by Mary J. Blige, which itself samples "You Are Everything" by The Stylistics.

Track listing
"Torn" (Edit)
"Torn" (Album Version)
"Torn" (A Cappella)
"Torn" (Instrumental)
"Tear Da Club Up" (Original Version)
"Tear Da Club Up" (H-Town Version)
"Tear Da Club Up" (Original Instrumental)
"Tear Da Club Up" (H-Town instrumental)

Release history

Charts

Weekly charts

Year-end charts

References

2006 debut singles
LeToya Luckett songs
Music videos directed by Chris Robinson (director)
Songs written by LeToya Luckett
2006 songs
Capitol Records singles
Contemporary R&B ballads

es:Torn